is a district of Nakano, Tokyo, Japan. 

As of October 2020, the population of this district is 20,698. The postal code for Minamidai is 164-0014.

Geography
Minamidai borders Yayoichō in the north, Honmachi to the east, Sasazuka and Hatagaya to the south, and Hōnan to the west.

Education
Nakano City Board of Education (中野区教育委員会) operates public elementary and junior high schools.

1-2-chome are zoned to Minamino Elementary School (みなみの小学校). 3-5-chome are zoned to Minamidai Elementary School (南台小学校). All residents are zoned to Minami Nakano Junior High School (南中野中学校).

References

Neighborhoods of Tokyo
Nakano, Tokyo